Egbert van Heemskerck, or Egbert Jaspersz van Heemskerk (1634–1704) was a Haarlem Dutch Golden Age painter of genre works who died in London in 1704. He is often confused with another genre painter also called Egbert van Heemskerk III who lived  – 1744.

Biography
Attempts to distinguish the work of the elder and younger Heemskerck, where they overlap, have as yet been unsuccessful. An even older Egbert van Heemskerk, often reported to have lived from 1610–1680, may not have existed. Egbert van Heemskerck the Younger was born between 1666 and 1686 and died in 1744, the locations apparently unknown, but he worked in London for John Wilmor, Earl of Rochester in 1670.

Egbert Jaspersz van Heemskerck or Egbert van Heemskerck the Elder (1634–1704) was born in Haarlem to the doctor Jasper Jaspersz van Heemskerck and his wife Marytge Jansdr van Stralen.  After his father's death, his mother Marytge married the art dealer Jan Wijnants in 1651. This art dealer was the father of the landscape painter Jan Wijnants, making Jan and Egbert stepbrothers. He became a member of the Haarlem Guild of St. Luke in 1646 and has been reported to be a student of Pieter de Grebber. Though listed in 1646, he may have become a member in 1664 (a year suspiciously lacking member registrations), like other members mistakenly registered in 1646, such as Evert Collier and Evert Oudendijck.

In Haarlem in 1663 he declared himself to be 28, and in 1665, he declared himself to be 31 years old. In the early 1680s he moved to London, where one of his often satirical paintings apparently landed him in serious trouble with King Charles II of England. Though he is registered as having died in London in 1704, he was listed by Laurens van der Vinne as one of the painters who had predeceased his father in 1702.

Various paintings are exhibited in the Rijksmuseum in Amsterdam, the Louvre in Paris, the Musée des Beaux-Arts in Tournai, the Bowes Museum in Barnard Castle, the National Gallery of Victoria, Melbourne, and the Fitzwilliam Museum in Cambridge.

References

External links

Triktrak players, Rijksmuseum
Artcyclopedia entry
Egbert Heemskerck on Artnet
Egbert Heemskerck II in the RKD

1634 births
1704 deaths
Dutch Golden Age painters
Dutch male painters
Dutch genre painters
Artists from Haarlem
Painters from Haarlem